Pseudochromis leucorhynchus, or the white-nosed dottyback, is a species of ray-finned fish from the Western Indian Ocean: from Oman to Kenya, and the Socotra Archipelago. It is a member of the family Pseudochromidae.

References

leucorhynchus
Taxa named by Roger Lubbock
Fish described in 1977